Pseudorbis jameoensis is a species of minute sea snail, a marine gastropod mollusk in the family Skeneidae.

Description
The height of the shell attains 0.72 mm, its diameter 0.84 mm.

Distribution
This species occurs in the Atlantic Ocean off the Canary Islands.

References

 Rubio F. & Rodriguez Babio C. (1991) Sobre la posición sistemática de Pseudorbis granulum Brugnone, 1873 (Mollusca, Archeogastropoda, Skeneidae) y descripción de Pseudorbis jameoensis n. sp., procedente de las Islas Canarias. Iberus 9(1–2): 203–207

jameoensis
Gastropods described in 1991